"Mein Land" (German for "My country") is a song by German Neue Deutsche Härte band Rammstein. It was released as a single from their greatest hits album, Made in Germany 1995–2011, on 11 November 2011 in Germany, Austria and Switzerland and internationally on 14 November. The cover art is based on The Beach Boys' Surfer Girl album cover.

Music video 
The music video for "Mein Land" was filmed on 23 May 2011 at Sycamore Cove State Beach in Malibu, California. It was directed by Jonas Åkerlund and depicts band members in casual 1960s beach attire. It shows them having a party while words in Beach Boys-type font describe the beach party. Near the end of the video, it cuts to 2012 and shows the band performing at the same beach, but dressed up industrially with flames shooting from various things around the stage. During the stage performance, each band member has face paint similar to Brandon Lee in the film The Crow. The music video was released on 11 November 2011.

Track listing 
All songs by Rammstein.
CD single
 "Mein Land" ("My Land") - 3:53
 "Vergiss uns nicht" ("Don't forget us") - 4:10
 "My Country" (The BossHoss) - 4:08
 "Mein Land" (Mogwai Mix) - 4:30

7" vinyl
 "Mein Land" - 3:53
 "Vergiss uns nicht" - 4:10

Charts

References 

 Rammstein To Release New Single, “Mein Land,” on November 11. Revolvermag.com. 24 October 2011. Retrieved 11 November 2011.

External links 
 Rammstein - Mein Land
 Making of the "Mein Land" music video
 Translation of Mein Land

2011 singles
Rammstein songs
Songs written by Richard Z. Kruspe
Songs written by Paul Landers
Songs written by Till Lindemann
Songs written by Christian Lorenz
Songs written by Oliver Riedel
Songs written by Christoph Schneider
Music videos directed by Jonas Åkerlund